The 2017 Asian Shotgun Championships were held in Astana, Kazakhstan between August 3 and 14, 2017.

Medal summary

Men

Women

Mixed

Medal table

References 

 ISSF Results Overview
 Complete Results

External links 
 Asian Shooting Federation

Asian Shooting Championships
Asian
Shooting
Sport in Astana
2017 in Kazakhstani sport
August 2017 sports events in Kazakhstan